Lawrance may refer to

Lawrance Aero Engine Company
Lawrance Garden, former name of Bagh-e-Jinnah, a garden in Lahore, Pakistan

People with the given name
Lawrance  Collingwood CBE (1887–1982), English conductor, composer and record producer
Lawrance Reilly (1928–2013), Scottish footballer
Lawrance Thompson (1906–1973), American academic

People with the surname
Mary Lawrance (fl. 1794-1830), English botanical illustrator
Hannah Lawrance (1795–1875), English historian and journalist
Sir John Compton Lawrance (1832–1912), English judge and politician
Walter Lawrance (1840–1914), Church of England priest
Charles Lawrance (1882–1950), American aeronautical engineer
Jody Lawrance (1930–1986), American actress
Jeremy Lawrance (born 1952), English linguist and historian
Jodie Lawrance, Author and actor

See also
Lawrence (disambiguation)